Lighthouse Keeping is a 1946 American animated cartoon directed by Jack Hannah and produced by Walt Disney. In the cartoon, Donald battles with an angry pelican to keep his lighthouse light on.

The pelican's name is not used in the short, but Disney A to Z reveals that his name is Marblehead.

Plot 
Donald is bored with his job as a lighthouse keeper as he can't read his book while the light turns around, and when he notices a sleeping pelican out the window, he decides to wake him up by shining the light on him. The pelican gets fed up and invades the lighthouse, putting out the light. Donald and the pelican engage in a fast-paced duel for the rest of the night, turning the light on and off, even continuing after sunrise.

Voice cast
 Clarence Nash as Donald Duck

Television
 Disneyland, episode #4.7: "Duck for Hire"
 Donald's Quack Attack, episode #37
 The Ink and Paint Club, episode #1.21: "Goin' to the Birds"

Home media
The short was released on December 6, 2005, on Walt Disney Treasures: The Chronological Donald, Volume Two: 1942-1946.

Additional release include:
 Bonus on Pete's Dragon 2000 Gold Classic Collection

References

External links 
 
 Lighthouse Keeping at The Internet Animation Database
 Lighthouse Keeping on BFI
 Lighthouse Keeping on Filmaffinity

Donald Duck short films
Films produced by Walt Disney
1940s Disney animated short films
Films directed by Jack Hannah
Films scored by Oliver Wallace
1946 animated films
1946 films